Rana Arif Kamal Noon is a Pakistani advocate. He was elected as chairman executive, Punjab Bar Council for the term 2009–10. He was previously elected as Member Punjab Bar Council from Lodhran.
Rana Arif Kamal made it clear in his era that no one would be allowed to exploit the lawyers for his personal interests.

Judgments as Chairman Executive Punjab Bar Council
Rana Arif Kamal Noon warned the two rival groups in the Lahore High Court Bar Association of professional misconduct proceedings if any brawl occurs there in future. PBC Executive Committee Chairman Rana Arif Kamal Noon gave the warning during the hearing of a petition against the victory of Nasira Iqbal as the LHCBA president in a controversial by-election. He asked both the sides to stop fighting and wait for the decision of the committee. Former president of the Lahore High Court Bar Association, Ahmad Awais, appeared on behalf of Nasira Iqbal and extended his arguments on the by-election and questioned the jurisdiction of Punjab Bar Council in the matter.

Adjourning the hearing of the petition, Noon said whatever was happening in the LHCBA from both sides was tarnishing the image of the legal fraternity. The Punjab Bar Council would take suo motu notice of further misconduct and take punitive action, including the cancellation of licences of those involved.

The Punjab Bar Council's Executive Chairman Rana Arif Kamal Noon declared the election of Justice (R) Nasira Iqbal to the office of the Lahore High Court Bar Association's president null and void, and restrained vice-president Munawar Iqbal Gondal from working as president.

Disposing of a complaint filed by Mr Gondal against the election of Nasira Iqbal, Chairman Executive Rana Arif Kamal Noon, also decided that fresh election would be held under the supervision of the Punjab Bar Council. Both Munawar Gondal and Nasira Iqbal hailed the decision.

See also
Law of India

References

External links
 My.opera.com

Chairmen of the Punjab Bar Council
Advocates
Pakistani lawyers
Living people
Year of birth missing (living people)
People from Lahore